Pygmaepterys richardbinghami is a species of sea snail, a marine gastropod mollusk in the family Muricidae, the murex snails or rock snails.

Description
Original description: "Shell fusiform, elongated with elevated spire; shell with 8 varices per whorl; body whorl ornamented with 5 large, evenly-spaced, raised cords; siphonal canal with 4 cords; spire whorls with 3 spiral cords; shoulder tabulate, sharp-angled; varices thin, winglike, with 5 large bladelike serrations; serrations correspond to cords in intervarical regions; posteriormost serration largest, spinelike, pointed posteriorly; aperture small, oval; outer lip thickened, with 5 large denticles along inner edge; shell color tan, with 2 thin reddish-brown bands, 1 around subsutural region and 1 around break between body whorl and siphonal canal; spire whorls with reddish-brown sub-sutural band; interior of aperture pale tan."

The shell size is 17 mm.

Distribution
Locus typicus: "Off Palm Beach Island, Palm Beach, Florida, USA."

This species occurs in the Gulf of Mexico off Eastern Florida

References

 Petuch E.J. (1987). New Caribbean molluscan faunas. Charlottesville, Virginia: The Coastal Education and Research Foundation. 154 pp., 29 pls; addendum 2 pp., 1 pl.
 Rosenberg, G., F. Moretzsohn, and E. F. García. 2009. Gastropoda (Mollusca) of the Gulf of Mexico, pp. 579–699 in Felder, D.L. and D.K. Camp (eds.), Gulf of Mexico–Origins, Waters, and Biota. Biodiversity. Texas A&M Press, College Station, Texas

Muricidae
Gastropods described in 1987